Hart Burn is a river that flows through Northumberland, England. It is a tributary of the River Wansbeck, is 24 km long and has a catchment area of 45 km squared.

Course
Hart Burn forms at the confluence of Ottercops Burn and Birky Burn just North West of Raechester and South West of Harwood.
The river then proceeds South East through/near -
 Hartington Hall
 Rothley
 Scots' Gap
 Hartburn - from which the river takes its name
 Meldon Park
lastly feeding into the River Wansbeck near Meldon Park.

Major Tributaries
From Source to Mouth:
 Fairnley Burn
 Chesters Burn
 Holy Burn
 Delf Burn
 Angerton Lake
 Dean Burn

References 

Rivers of Northumberland